The Augustana Vikings are the athletic teams that represent Augustana University, located in Sioux Falls, South Dakota, in NCAA Division II intercollegiate sports. The Vikings compete as members of the Northern Sun Intercollegiate Conference for all 14 varsity sports. The Vikings joined the NSIC from the North Central Conference, which folded in 2008.

In December 2018 Augustana announced its intentions to transition to NCAA Division I by 2030 at the latest. However, they had hoped to receive a bid to join a conference by 2020, according to Sioux Falls newspaper The Argus Leader. Multiple regional media reports in 2018 indicated that Augustana's likeliest Division I destination was the Sioux Falls-based Summit League. Many of the school's boosters are tied to Sanford Health, a hospital company also based in Sioux Falls that has long been a major sponsor of the Summit League. The conference moved its headquarters in 2018 to an office complex owned by Sanford.
On May 22, 2020, the Summit League commissioner, Tom Douple, informed Augustana president Stephanie Herseth Sandlin that the conference would not be adding more new teams "at this time."

Varsity sports

List of teams

Men's sports
 Baseball
 Basketball
 Cross Country
 Football
 Golf
 Ice Hockey (starting 2023)
 Tennis
 Track & Field
 Wrestling
 Soccer (NIRSA)

Women's sports
 Basketball
 Cross Country
 Golf
 Soccer
 Softball
 Swimming
 Tennis
 Track & Field
 Volleyball

NCAA Division II National Championships
 1991 – Softball
 2011 – Women's Cross Country
 2016 – Men's Basketball
 2018 – Baseball
 2019 – Softball

Football

On September 26, 2007, it was officially announced that Bob and Kari Hall were making a $7.1 million donation for an on-campus football stadium. The stadium is to bear the name The Bob Jr in honor of Kari Hall's parents.  Construction began on November 12, 2007 with the official groundbreaking taking place on November 16, 2007. Augustana University recently completed the Hall Football Complex; complete with its own locker rooms, weight room, and football meeting rooms. The head football coach is Jerry Olszewski.

Augustana players who have had significant NFL careers include Les Josephson (Los Angeles Rams –), Bryan Schwartz (Jacksonville Jaguars 1995–1999), Corbin Lacina (1993–2003), Kevin Kaesviharn (2001–2009), and C. J. Ham (Minnesota Vikings –present).

The Vikings have appeared in the NCAA Division II Playoffs 6 times. Their combined record is 1–6.

Wrestling
In 1976–77, 2004–05, and 2009–10, the Augustana wrestling team finished second in the NCAA Division II Championship. The Elmen Center serves as the home for both the volleyball team and the wrestling team.

Men's Basketball
In 2015–16 the men's basketball team coached by Tom Billeter finished the season 34–2 and won the NCAA Division II National Championship. On November 6, 2015 at Carver-Hawkeye Arena in Iowa City, the Vikings upset the Iowa Hawkeyes of the Big Ten Conference 76–74 in an exhibition game on a buzzer-beating right-handed jumper by Daniel Jansen. Led by Jansen, the Northern Sun Intercollegiate Conference's Player of the Year, the Vikings were 21–1 in the Northern Sun, then won the NSIC tournament title and captured the Central Regional title with an 80–78 victory over Northwest Missouri State to qualify for the Elite Eight, which was played at Dr Pepper Arena in Frisco, Texas. Augustana defeated Lincoln Memorial 90–81 in the championship game on March 26. Augustana's Arvid Kramer and Brett Szabo both played in the NBA.

The Vikings have appeared in the NCAA Division II Tournament 15 times. Their combined record is 19–17. They were National Champions in 2016.

Women's Basketball
The 2012–13 women's basketball team played at San Antonio in the NCAA Division II Elite Eight.

The Vikings have appeared in the NCAA Division II Tournament 15 times. Their combined record is 12–15.

The Sanford Pentagon and the Elmen Center serve as the home court for the men's and women's basketball teams.

Baseball
The 2018 Augustana baseball team won the NCAA Division II College World Series, defeating Columbus State 3–2 in the final. They finished the year 52–9, a school record.

Ice Hockey

On October 5, 2021 Augustana University announced that it will add men's ice hockey starting in the fall of 2023. The team will compete at the NCAA Division I level in the CCHA. The announcement was made at the groundbreaking ceremony for Midco Arena which will serve as the team's home.

References 
 Augustana (SD) Football
 NCAA Division II Football playoffs jonfmorse.com
 2013 NCAA manual
 NCAA Division II men's basketball tournament jonfmorse.com
 Augustana (SD) Men's Basketball
 NCAA Division II women's basketball tournament jonfmorse.com
 Augustana (SD) Women's Basketball